Cape Selborne is a high snow-covered cape at the south side of Barne Inlet, the terminus of Byrd Glacier at the west side of the Ross Ice Shelf. Discovered by the Discovery expedition (1901–1904) and named for William Waldegrave Palmer Selborne, Second Earl of Selborne, who entered the Cabinet as First Lord of the Admiralty in 1900. Cape Selborne marks the boundary between the Shackleton Coast to the south and the Hillary Coast to the north.

Headlands of the Ross Dependency
Shackleton Coast
Hillary Coast